Yasukouchi Asakichi (April 15, 1873 – July 15, 1927) was a Japanese politician who served as governor of Hiroshima Prefecture from May 1918 to April 1919. He was governor of Shizuoka Prefecture (1915-1918), Fukuoka Prefecture (1919-1922)
and Kanagawa Prefecture (1922–1924).

Governors of Hiroshima
1873 births
1927 deaths
Japanese Home Ministry government officials
Governors of Shizuoka Prefecture
Governors of Fukuoka Prefecture
Governors of Kanagawa Prefecture